John Sam Williams (born October 26, 1966) is an American former basketball player who played professionally for several seasons in the National Basketball Association (NBA) and the Liga ACB.

His girth earned him the nickname "Hot Plate" Williams, in part to help distinguish him from John "Hot Rod" Williams of the Cleveland Cavaliers who likewise played college basketball in Louisiana (at Tulane University) and who also entered the NBA in 1986.
Despite his size, in which he ballooned to close to 260 pounds by the time he was drafted, Williams was a highly skilled basketball player. He was in particular an exceptionally good passer, and averaged over 4 assists per game in 3 separate seasons, an excellent average for a player his size. He was frequently used as a point forward, handling the ball and conducting the offense.

College career
Williams played collegiately for LSU, and was drafted into the National Basketball Association by the Washington Bullets in 1986 with the 12th overall pick.

Professional career
As a rookie, Williams averaged just under ten points and five rebounds per game for the Bullets.  He improved significantly his second season, and started 37 of 82 games.  The 1988–89 NBA season, his third, was clearly his best, as he achieved career-high season totals in almost every statistical category, despite coming off the bench in all but one game.

Williams' productivity declined in the five injury-plagued seasons that followed. He missed more than half of four of those five seasons due to various injuries, which, though not necessarily caused by his weight, were certainly aggravated by it.  His eight-year NBA career included five seasons with the Bullets, two with the Los Angeles Clippers, and one (his final season) with the Indiana Pacers. He left the NBA in 1995, but went on to play 132 games over 6 seasons in the Spanish Liga ACB, averaging 15.6 points and 7.3 rebounds.

Weight issues and player profile 
Williams' eating problems and weight issues were as a result of stress and depression. By the time he entered the draft, he lost his grandmother, two childhood friends, while supporting his mother, grandfather and children from previous marriages. His weight issues got so bad that Bullets and Clippers put him on weight reduction programs, and suspended him with no pay.

By the time he played for the Pacers, his offensive skills and court vision had not diminished, but his vertical leap and stamina suffered significantly due to his weight, making him a defensive liability. At his lowest weight, he managed to drop to 235 lbs, but he gained weight back up to about 260 lbs.

References

External links
NBA statistics at Basketball-Reference.com
Liga ACB statistics at Basketball-Reference.com
College statistics at Sports-Reference.com

1966 births
Living people
African-American basketball players
American expatriate basketball people in Spain
American men's basketball players
Basketball coaches from California
Basketball players from Los Angeles
Bàsquet Manresa players
CB Granada players
CB Lucentum Alicante players
CB Valladolid players
Centers (basketball)
Continental Basketball Association coaches
Indiana Pacers players
Liga ACB players
Los Angeles Clippers players
LSU Tigers basketball players
McDonald's High School All-Americans
Parade High School All-Americans (boys' basketball)
Power forwards (basketball)
Washington Bullets draft picks
Washington Bullets players
Crenshaw High School alumni
21st-century African-American people
20th-century African-American sportspeople